Juan Delgado Sirvent (born 1 March 1994) is a Spanish footballer who plays for UE Olot as a forward.

Club career
Born in Elda, Alicante, Valencian Community, Delgado finished his formation with Valencia CF. He made his senior debuts with the reserve team in the 2011–12 season, in Segunda División B.

On 14 January 2014 Delgado signed a new two-year deal with the Che, and was loaned to Celta de Vigo B, until June. On 16 July he joined another reserve team, Levante UD B also in the third level.

Delgado made his first appearance with the main squad on 6 January 2015, coming on as a substitute for Rafael Martins in the 80th minute of a 0–2 away loss against Málaga CF, for the campaign's Copa del Rey.

References

External links
Levante official profile 

1994 births
Living people
People from Elda
Sportspeople from the Province of Alicante
Spanish footballers
Footballers from the Valencian Community
Association football forwards
Segunda División B players
Tercera División players
Valencia CF Mestalla footballers
Celta de Vigo B players
Atlético Levante UD players
Levante UD footballers
Hércules CF players
Barakaldo CF footballers
UE Olot players
Spain youth international footballers